Western City Tigers Rugby League Football Club is an Australian rugby league football club based in Mount Druitt, New South Wales formed in 1984.

Notable Juniors 
Notable First Grade Players that have played at Western City Tigers (Mount Druitt) include:
Michael Jennings (2007-2020 Penrith Panthers, Roosters, and Eels)
Geoff Daniela (2007-2013 Penrith Panthers, and Wests Tigers)
Kurtley Beale (2007- NSW Waratahs and Melbourne Rebels)
Siosaia Vave (2010-18 Melbourne Storm, Sharks, Manly Sea Eagles, and Parramatta Eels)
Tim Simona (2011-2016 Wests Tigers)
George Jennings (2015- Penrith Panthers, Parramatta Eels, New Zealand Warriors, and Melbourne Storm)
Robert Jennings (2015- Penrith Panthers, South Sydney Rabbitohs, and Wests Tigers)

See also

List of rugby league clubs in Australia
Rugby league in New South Wales

References

External links
Western City Tigers RLFC Fox Sports pulse

Rugby league teams in Sydney
Rugby clubs established in 1984
1984 establishments in Australia